Mont St. Jean is a hill, castle, and religious site in the commune of Dudelange, in southern Luxembourg.

Mont St. Jean has probably been a point of religious interest since pre-Christian times. The annual pilgrimage to St. John's Chapel, on the summit, on St. John's Eve (23 June) was accompanied in the Middle Ages by ecstatic dancing. The ritualistic dance, a surviving example of which is found at Echternach, was supposedly performed to ward off St. Vitus Dance, but is possibly a relic of pagan times.

A castle and commandery of the Order of St. John was built at Mont St. Jean in the sixteenth century; the site belonged to the von Isenburg family at this time. In 1937, Stations of the Cross were constructed, which are used on St. John's Eve to this day.

Dudelange
Buildings and structures in Dudelange
Mountains and hills of Luxembourg